The Verge is the third and final full-length album from the alternative rock band There For Tomorrow. It was released on Hopeless Records on June 28, 2011. The album was voted one of the most anticipated albums of the year by the Alternative Press. The album's first single, "Hunt Hunt Hunt", was released on February 29, 2011. The second single is "The Joyride",  and it was released on June 28, 2011. The Verge'''s album art and track listing was released on May 12, 2011, with each song length released on May 29.

Reception
Overall reception has been good for The Verge''. Alter the Press said that There for Tomorrow "have upped the ante significantly" in their music writing. Many reviewers note the progress in their writing, Maile's falsetto on BLU, and how longtime fans would be pleased.

Track listing

Personnel
Maika Maile - lead vocals, rhythm guitar, piano on "BLU"
Christian Climer - lead guitar, backing vocals
Jay Enriquez - bass, backing vocals
Christopher Kamrada - drums, percussion
The Undesigned - Art Direction
James Lano - Design
Jeff Moll - Editor
Gage Young -  Photography 
Dave Holdredge - Engineer
Larry Mazer - Management
Mastered By – Alan Douches
Mastered In - West West Side Music
Mixed By – Dave Holdredge
Written, recorded, and mixed - Paint It Black Studios

Charts

References

2011 albums
There for Tomorrow albums
Hopeless Records albums